Indian Justice Party (IJP) was a political party in India that was established by Udit Raj in 2003. He was an Indian Revenue Service officer and had resigned in 2003 to form Indian Justice Party.

Merger with Bharatiya Janta Party 

Udit Raj, Founder and head of the National Confederation of SCs/STs on 24 February 2014 announced merger of his party to Bharatiya Janata Party in presence of BJP National President Rajnath Singh. Mr. Raj said "I had talked to BJP on issues related to role of Dalits in governance and running the country, and only after that he decided to join the BJP.

References

External links
 BSP secretary joins Indian Justice Party

Defunct political parties in India
Political parties established in 2003
2003 establishments in India
Political parties disestablished in 2004
2004 disestablishments in India